Farida Mohamed (born 15 January 2002 in Alexandria), is an Egyptian professional squash player. Farida is known as “The Bazooka” for her power and explosiveness. As of July 2022, she was ranked number 15 in the world. She won the 2018 Growthpoint South Africa Open PSA professional tournament, which was her first appearance on the PSA world tour, beating fellow Egyptian Menna Nasser in the final.

Her sister is the Columbia Lions women's squash player Habiba Mohamed Ahmed Aly Mohamed. Habiba graduated Columbia class of 2022 and farida is enrolled in Columbia University class of 2024 and she is currently playing at number 1 on her team at Columbia.<ref>

References

Egyptian female squash players
Living people
Columbia Lions women's squash players
2002 births
21st-century Egyptian women